Bolshoy Kikus is a rural locality (a selo) in Cherdynsky District, Perm Krai, Russia. The population was 8 as of 2010. There are 3 streets.

Geography 
Bolshoy Kikus is located 76 km northeast of Cherdyn (the district's administrative centre) by road. Maly Kikus is the nearest rural locality.

References 

Rural localities in Cherdynsky District